Syria missile strikes may refer to:

Syria missile strikes (September 2018)
Syria missile strikes (August 2019)
Syria missile strikes (November 2019)
Syria missile strikes (January 2021)